Bicurga is a town in Equatorial Guinea. It is located in the province of Centro Sur and has a (2005 est.) population of 2318.

References

Populated places in Centro Sur